Legislative Assembly elections was held in the Indian state of West Bengal in 1962.

Parties
Ahead of the polls, the Communist Party of India, the All India Forward Bloc, the Marxist Forward Bloc, the Revolutionary Communist Party of India, the Bolshevik Party of India and the Revolutionary Socialist Party had formed the electoral alliance United Left Front.

Results

Elected members

References

State Assembly elections in West Bengal
1960s in West Bengal
1962 in India
West Bengal